Women of Luxury is a 1925 German silent comedy film directed by Erich Schönfelder and starring Lee Parry, Hans Albers and Rudolf Lettinger. It was made at the Johannisthal Studios near Berlin. The film's sets were designed by the art directors Jacek Rotmil and Siegfried Wroblewsky.

Cast
 Lee Parry as Harriet von Randow
 Hans Albers as Kurt von Randow
 Rudolf Lettinger as Hermann von Benthien
 Olaf Fjord as Wolfgang Rainer
 Lia Eibenschütz as Lissy Rainer
 Robert Garrison as Ludwig Moser
 Lydia Potechina as Ellen Moser
 Iwa Wanja as Karla Moser
 Gertrud von Hoschek as Daisy Moser
 Julius Falkenstein as Enver Kiral-Bey
 Hans Junkermann as Otto von Brenken
 Paul Ludwig
 Werner Pittschau

References

Bibliography
 Ganeva, Mila . Women in Weimar Fashion: Discourses and Displays in German Culture, 1918–1933. Camden House, 2008.

External links

1925 films
Films of the Weimar Republic
Films directed by Erich Schönfelder
German silent feature films
German comedy films
1926 comedy films
1926 films
Films shot at Johannisthal Studios
German black-and-white films
1925 comedy films
Silent comedy films
1920s German films